The Zambia Daily Mail is an English-language daily broadsheet newspaper published in Zambia. It is one of two state-owned papers of the Zambian government.

History and operations
The newspaper arose from the Central African Mail, which was bought by the government from David Astor in 1965. It was renamed the Zambian Mail and subsequently the Zambia Daily Mail in 1970. The paper soon became a mouthpiece for the government, publishing official statements and press releases, while being instructed to become an "instrument in nation building". However, this saw a decline in readership and advertising.

In 2005, its circulation figures were estimated to be between 10,000 and 15,000.

See also

 Communications in Zambia
 List of newspapers in Zambia

References

External links
  Newspaper's official website

Publications with year of establishment missing
Daily newspapers published in Zambia
English-language newspapers published in Africa
Government agencies of Zambia